Group D of the 2001 Fed Cup Europe/Africa Zone Group I was one of four pools in the Europe/Africa Zone Group I of the 2001 Fed Cup. Four teams competed in a round robin competition, with the top team advancing to the play-offs and the bottom team being relegated down to Group II for 2002.

Israel vs. Denmark

Greece vs. Bulgaria

Israel vs. Bulgaria

Luxembourg vs. Denmark

Greece vs. Luxembourg

Bulgaria vs. Denmark

Israel vs. Luxembourg

Greece vs. Denmark

Israel vs. Greece

Luxembourg vs. Bulgaria

  placed last in the pool, and thus was relegated to Group II in 2001, where they achieved promotion back to Group I for 2002.

See also
Fed Cup structure

References

External links
 Fed Cup website

2001 Fed Cup Europe/Africa Zone